Lead Finder software is a computational chemistry application for modeling protein-ligand interactions. The software can be used in molecular docking studies, for the quantitative evaluation of ligand binding and biological activity. For individual, non-commercial and academic users the software is free.

About
Lead Finder software is an integrated solution for simulating structure and binding affinity of protein-ligand complexes. The software combines automatic processing of protein structures, extra precision protein-ligand docking and calculation of free energy of ligand binding. Original docking algorithm provides a fast rate of calculations, which can be easily adjusted from more rapid (for virtual screening applications) to slightly more slow and robust, while unique scoring function implemented in Lead Finder provides unsurpassed accuracy of calculations. 
Lead Finder is intended to meet the requirements of computational and medicinal chemists involved in drug discovery, pharmacologists and toxicologists involved in the evaluation of ADMET properties in silico, and biochemists and enzymologists working on modeling protein-ligand interactions, enzyme specificity and rational enzyme design.
Efficiency of ligand docking and binding energy estimations achieved by Lead Finder are due to docking algorithm and extra precision representation of protein-ligand interactions.

Docking algorithm
From a mathematical point of view ligand docking represents a search for global minimum on the multidimensional surface describing the free energy of protein-ligand binding. With ligands having up to 15-20 degrees of freedom (freely rotatable bonds) and complex nature of energy surface, global optimum search represents a generally unsolved scientific task. To tackle this computationally challenging problem, Lead Finder applies a unique approach combining genetic algorithm search, local optimization procedures, and a smart exploitation of the knowledge generated during the search run. Rational combination of different optimization strategies makes Lead Finder efficient in terms of coarse sampling of ligand's phase space and refinement of promising solutions.

Scoring function
Extra precise representation of protein-ligand interactions implemented in Lead Finder scoring function is the second (in addition to docking algorithm) component of successful ligand docking. Lead Finder scoring function is based on a semi-empiric molecular mechanical functional, which explicitly accounts for different types of molecular interactions. Individual energy contributions are scaled with empiric coefficients to fit particular purposes: accurate binding energy predictions, correct energy-ranking of docked ligand poses, correct rank-ordering of active and inactive compounds during virtual screening experiments. For these reasons, three distinct types of scoring functions based on the same set of energy contributions but different sets of energy-scaling coefficients are used by Lead Finder.

Docking success rate
Docking success rate was benchmarked as a percentage of correctly docked ligands (for which top-scored pose was within 2 Å RMSD from the reference ligand coordinates) for a set of protein-ligand complexes extracted from PDB. A set of 407 protein-ligand complexes was used for current docking success rate measurements. This set of complexes was combined from test sets used in original benchmarking studies of such docking programs as: FlexX, Glide SP, Glide XP, Gold, LigandFit, MolDock, Surflex.

Accuracy of binding energy estimations
The ability of Lead Finder to estimate free energy of protein-ligand binding was benchmarked against the set of 330 diverse protein-ligand complexes, which is currently the most extensive benchmarking study of such kind. Lead Finder demonstrated unique precision of binding energy prediction (RMSD = 1.5 kcal/mol) combined with high speed of calculations (less than one second per compound on average).

References

Molecular modelling software
Molecular modelling